An election to the electoral county of South Dublin within Dublin County to Dublin County Council took place on 27 June 1991 as part of that year's Irish local elections. 26 councillors were elected from 5 local electoral areas on the system of proportional representation by means of the single transferable vote for a five-year term of office. It was one of three electoral counties within Dublin County at this election, the others being Fingal and Dún Laoghaire–Rathdown.

The electoral county had been established in 1985 as Dublin–Belgard and was renamed South Dublin for these local elections.

From 1 January 1994, on the coming into effect of the Local Government (Dublin) Act 1993, County Dublin was disestablished as an administrative county, and in its place the electoral counties became three new counties. The councillors listed below became the councillors for South Dublin County Council from that date.

Results by party

Results by Electoral Area

Clondalkin

Greenhills

Lucan

Rathfarnam

Tallaght-Oldbawn

Tallaght-Rathcoole

Terenure

References

External links
 Official website
 irishelectionliterature

1991 Irish local elections
1991